Pimelea pauciflora, commonly known as poison rice-flower, is a species of shrub in the family Thymelaeaceae. It  has small yellow-lime flowers and green, smooth fleshy leaves, and is endemic to Eastern Australia.

Description
The flowers are yellowish-green and arranged in clusters of 3 to 9, mostly at the end of branches usually surrounded by 2 green, narrowly elliptic to egg-shaped involucral bracts. Flowering occurs from September to November.

Taxonomy and naming
Pimelea pauciflora was first formally described in 1810 by Robert Brown and the description was published in Prodromus Florae Novae Hollandiae et Insulae Van Diemen. The specific epithet (pauciflora) is from the Latin pauci- meaning "few"  and  -florus meaning "flowered".

Distribution and habitat
Poison rice-flower is found growing in open scrubland, forests, sometimes in dense thickets at higher altitudes south from Queanbeyan in New South Wales. In Victoria it grows near mountain streams in a few scattered locations. It also occurs in a few places in north-eastern Tasmania.

References

pauciflora
Malvales of Australia
Flora of New South Wales
Flora of Tasmania
Flora of Victoria (Australia)
Taxa named by Robert Brown (botanist, born 1773)
Dioecious plants
Plants described in 1810